Peoples Voice (abbreviation: PV) is an opposition political party in Singapore.

History
Peoples Voice was formed after Lim Tean resigned from the National Solidarity Party in 2017, thus stepping down from the secretary-general position as well, citing fundamental differences in approach to politics.  was officially registered on 31 October 2018 with the Registry of Societies.

In March 2019, Leong Sze Hian was made the PV shadow finance minister. Kok Ming Cheang is the shadow cabinet minister for health.

 had put forward 10 candidates to contest in the  Mountbatten Single Member Constituency, Jalan Besar Group Representation Constituency (GRC) and Pasir Ris–Punggol GRC for the 2020 Singaporean general election, which was called on 23 June 2020 with the dissolution of the 13th Parliament of Singapore, for the latter it was also a three-cornered contest against a third party, Singapore Democratic Alliance. On 10 July, the party won none of the constituencies, and their five-member team for Pasir Ris–Punggol GRC team had lost a combined $67,500 election deposit (five times the deposit of $13,500 per candidate) for garnering only 12.18% of the votes, falling just 0.32% short of the one-eighth threshold (12.5%) in order to keep their deposit. In terms of the share, they got 21.26% of the votes cast on all the constituencies contested, and 2.37% based on overall popular vote.

Leadership

Electoral history

See also 
 Elections in Singapore
 List of political parties in Singapore
 Politics of Singapore

References

External links 
 

Political parties in Singapore
2018 establishments in Singapore
Political parties established in 2018